Helen Anne Henderson (May 11, 1946 – April 11, 2015) was a Canadian disability rights activist and journalist.

Biography 
Henderson was born on May 11, 1946, in Scotland. In 1954, Henderson and her family immigrated to Quebec.

Henderson attended Bishop's University in Quebec for an English degree and later pursued a degree in disability studies at Ryerson University. In 2011, Henderson gave a TEDx talk at Ryerson about seeing the opportunity in people with disabilities.

In the 1970s, Henderson was diagnosed with multiple sclerosis. As a result of her MS, Henderson later used a cane and a wheelchair.

Henderson sought palliative care at Bridgepoint Health and died on April 11, 2015, from complications due to lung cancer.

Career 
Henderson began writing for the Toronto Star in the 1970s and retired in 2008. Though she began her career at the Star as a business reporter, the first female business reporter there, Henderson eventually began writing a column about disability. Henderson's column was "the longest running disability beat in Canada" according to Katie Ellis.

In 2016, in recognition of Henderson's contributions to disability rights awareness, the Centre for Independent Living in Toronto (CILT) established the Helen Henderson Literary Award "to acknowledge an exceptional piece of writing that raises social awareness of a disability issue or barrier".

See also

References 

20th-century Canadian journalists
21st-century Canadian journalists
Canadian women journalists
Canadian columnists
Toronto Star people
Bishop's University alumni
Toronto Metropolitan University alumni
Canadian disability rights activists
Wheelchair users
People with multiple sclerosis
Deaths from lung cancer
1946 births
2015 deaths
Deaths from cancer in Ontario
Canadian women columnists
Scottish emigrants to Canada
20th-century Canadian women writers